Coptotriche malifoliella is a moth of the family Tischeriidae. It was described by James Brackenridge Clemens in 1860. It is found in North America in Ontario, the District of Columbia, Indiana, Kentucky, Massachusetts, New Jersey, New York, Ohio, Pennsylvania and Texas.

The larvae feed on Crataegus coccinea, Malus coronaria and Malus domestica. They mine the leaves of their host plant.

References

Moths described in 1860
Tischeriidae